Morra can mean:

People
 Alberto di Morra (c. 1100/1105-1187), Pope Gregory VIII
 Bernardino Morra (died 1605), Roman Catholic prelate who served as Bishop of Aversa
 Claudio Morra, (born 1995) Italian footballer
 Galal al-Morra, Egyptian Islamist politician
 Isabella di Morra (c. 1520-1545/1546), Italian poet
 León S. Morra (1882–1948), Argentine doctor and university professor
 Mario Morra (born 1935), Italian film editor, director and screenwriter

Toponyms
 La Morra, a comune (municipality) in the Province of Cuneo, Italy
 Morra (Città di Castello), a frazione (territorial subdivision) in the Province of Perugia, Italy
 Morra, Dongeradeel, a hamlet in the province of Friesland, Netherlands
 Oued Morra, town and commune in Laghouat Province, Algeria
 Villa Morra, neighbourhood of Asunción, the capital of Paraguay

Other
 Morra (game), a game similar to rock, paper, scissors
 Edward "Eddie" Morra, character protagonist of the film Limitless

See also
 Mora (disambiguation)

Italian-language surnames